Kinetochore protein NDC80 homolog is a protein that in humans is encoded by the NDC80 gene.

Function 
Ndc80 is one of the proteins of outer kinetochore. It forms a heterotetramer with proteins NUF2, SPC25, and SPC24. This protein complex has microtubule-binding  domains. 

HEC is one of several proteins involved in spindle checkpoint signaling. This surveillance mechanism assures correct segregation of chromosomes during cell division by detecting unaligned chromosomes and causing prometaphase arrest until the proper bipolar attachment of chromosomes is achieved.

Interactions 

NDC80 has been shown to interact with MIS12, NEK2 and PSMC2.

References

Further reading 

 
 
 
 
 
 
 
 
 
 
 
 
 
 
 
 

Human proteins